Bindago is a settlement in the Bignona Department in Ziguinchor Region in Senegal. It had a population of 152 in 2002.

External links
PEPAM

References

Populated places in the Bignona Department
Arrondissement of Tenghory